The Gulf of Thailand,  also known as the Gulf of Siam,  is a shallow inlet in the southwestern South China Sea, bounded between the southwestern shores of the Indochinese Peninsula and the northern half of the Malay Peninsula. The gulf is surrounded on the north, west and southwest by the coastlines of Thailand (hence the name), on the northeast by Cambodia and the Mekong Delta region of Vietnam, and opens to the South China Sea in the southeast.

Names
The modern Thai name of the gulf is Ao Thai ('Thai Gulf') and "Gulf of Thailand" has been adopted as the official name of the body by the International Hydrographic Organization. In Thai, the gulf is historically known as Ao Sayam. In Vietnamese it is known as Vịnh Thái Lan.

It is generally identified with the Great Gulf known to Greek, Roman, Arab, Persian, and Renaissance cartographers before the influx of Portuguese explorers removed the phantom Dragon Tail peninsula from European world maps in the 16th century.

Geography

The Gulf of Thailand is bordered by Cambodia, Thailand, Malaysia, and Vietnam. It occupies a seabed area of 304,000 km2 from 6° N to 13°30' N latitude and 99°E to 104° E longitude. The northern tip of the gulf is the Bay of Bangkok at the mouth of the Chao Phraya River. The southern boundary of the gulf is defined by a line from Cape Bai Bung in southern Vietnam (just south of the mouth of the Mekong River) to the town of Tumpat and Pengkalan Chepa on the Malaysian coast.

This makes water exchange slow, and the strong water inflow from the rivers reduces the level of salinity in the gulf (3.05–3.25 percent) and enriches the sediments. Only at greater depths does water with a higher salinity (3.4 percent) flow into the gulf from the South China Sea. The main rivers which empty into the gulf are the Chao Phraya, including its distributary Tha Chin River, the Mae Klong, and Bang Pakong rivers at the Bay of Bangkok, and to a lesser degree the Tapi River flowing into Bandon Bay in the southwest of the gulf.

The International Hydrographic Organization defines the southern limit of the gulf as "[a] line running from the Western extreme of Cambodia or Camau Point (8°36'N) to the Northern extreme of the point on the East side of the estuary of the Kelantan River".

Seabed morphology
The seabed morphology in the central depression of the gulf is characterised by the presence of elongated mounds and ridges arranged parallel to the axis of the basin. This morphology, widespread within the gulf in water depths exceeding 50 m, covers an area of tens of thousands of square kilometres.

It reflects an interaction between sediment dewatering and the erosional activity of the present-day bottom currents. The sediment dewatering and fluid seepage result in the formation of numerous small pits and pockmarks. The long-term erosion imposed by currents of stable orientation modifies pockmarks into long runnels and depressions, and ultimately leads to the formation of the large fields of elongated mounds and ridges, as well as the residual outliers of un-eroded mud and clay sheets.

Bays
Thailand
 Bay of Bangkok
 Prachuap Bay
 Ao Manao
 Sattahip Bay
 Bandon Bay

Cambodia
 Bay of Kompong Som (Chhak Kompong Som)
 Veal Rinh Bay
 Kep Bay
 Chhak Koh Kong

Vietnam
 Vinh Thuan Yen
 Vinh Ba Hon
 Vinh Hon Chong

Islands

The larger islands in the gulf include:

 Ko Chang
 Ko Mak
 Ko Kut
 Ko Samui
 Ko Pha Ngan
 Ko Tao
 Ko Phaluai
 Ko Sichang
 Ko Lan
 Ko Phai
 Ko Khram
 Ko Samae San
 Ko Samet
 Ko Rang
 Ko Khangkhao
 Ko Man Nok
 Ko Wai
 Ko Phi
 Ko Kham
 Ko Sai
 Ko Kra
 Ko Losin
 Phú Quốc
 Thổ Chu Islands
 Hà Tiên Islands
 Bà Lụa Islands
 Nam Du Islands
 Koh Kong
 Koh Rong
 Koh Sdach
 Koh Rong Sanloem
 Koh Puos
 Koh Dek Koul
 Koh Russei
 Koh Ta Kiev
 Koh Preab
 Koh Thmei
 Koh Seh
 Koh Ach Seh
 Koh Tonsay
 Koh Tang
 Koh Pring
 Koh Poulo Wai

Environment

Coral reefs
There are 75,590 rai of coral reef in the gulf, of which five percent are considered to be in fertile condition. In 2010 severe coral bleaching occurred at most reef sites in the country. Bleaching of reefs in the Andaman Sea was more severe and extensive than that in the Gulf of Thailand. In 2016, coral bleaching was detected at Ko Thalu and Ko Lueam in Prachuap Khiri Khan Province for the first time. Scientists have determined that bleaching starts when seawater temperature rises beyond 30 °C for more than three weeks. Given the prolonged period of temperatures up to 32 °C at Ko Thalu in Prachuap Khiri Khan, five to ten percent of corals in the area are already bleached.

Water quality
Coastal water monitoring results in 2015 from 202 sampling locations, collected twice annually, indicate that no Thai coastal waters were found to be in excellent condition. Sixteen percent of coastal water was of good quality, 72 percent was of fair quality, 9 percent was of poor quality and 3 percent was of very poor quality. The quality of all coastal waters exhibited similar percentages — most were of fair quality — except for the Inner Gulf of Thailand, where the coastal water was poor to very poor. In comparison to coastal water quality as measured in 2014, water quality has deteriorated. Some gulf waters off Chachoengsao Province, Samut Sakhon Province, Samut Prakan Province, Bangkok, Rayong Province, Chonburi Province, Phetchaburi Province, Prachuap Khiri Khan Province, and Surat Thani Province were judged to have coastal waters in "poor" or "very poor" condition. Songkhla was the only province on the gulf with coastal water rated "good" quality.

Fisheries
Of Thailand's total marine catch, 41 percent is caught in the Gulf of Thailand and 19 percent in the Andaman Sea. Forty percent is caught in waters outside Thailand's EEZ.

Coastal erosion
Thailand has 1,660 kilometres of coastline bordering the gulf. "Severe erosion", more than five metres of coastline loss per year, afflicts 670 kilometres of that total. At least some of the erosion is attributable to the clearing of mangrove forests to make way for shrimp farms.

Plastic pollution
In February 2017, a 10 kilometer-long patch of plastic refuse was found floating off Chumphon Province. Thailand is among the world's worst plastic polluters. More than half of "land-based plastic waste leakage" into the sea originates from just five countries: China, Indonesia, the Philippines, Thailand, and Vietnam.

The Thai Marine and Coastal Resources Department has noted that at least 300 sea animals on average—60 per cent of which are whales and dolphins—die from eating plastic fishing gear and trash each year. Filter feeding invertebrates tested off the coast of Chonburi Province showed high levels of microplastics, leading the authors to warn that, "Health risks are possible when people consume these contaminated marine organisms, particularly shellfish."

Thailand's Pollution Control Department (PCD) estimates that plastic waste in the country is increasing at an annual rate of 12 percent, or around two million tonnes per year.

Oil spills
In 2013, a pipeline leak resulted in an oil slick that went on to coat a beach on the nearby Ka Samet island.

In late January 2022, a leak in the pipeline operated by the Star Petroleum Refining Public Company Ltd caused a spill of 20 to 50 tonnes across 47 sq km of water, with some oil reaching the coast of Rayong province 20 km away.

Tourism

The gulf's many coral reefs have made it attractive to divers. The tropical warmth of the water attracts many tourists. Some of the most important tourist destinations in the Gulf of Thailand are the islands of Ko Samui and Ko Pha Ngan in Surat Thani Province, Pattaya in Chonburi Province, Cha-am in Phetchaburi Province, Hua Hin in Prachuap Khiri Khan Province, and Ko Samet in Rayong Province.

In recent years, the bay has become known for its whale watching activities, targeting the endemic, critically endangered populations of cetaceans (Eden's whales, newly described Omura's whales, Chinese white dolphins, and Irrawaddy dolphins showing unique feeding behaviors), and dugongs. It was first classified by Müller in 1776 as Trichechus dugon. Five species of the sea turtles have been found in the Gulf of Thailand and the Andaman sea coast, including olive ridley turtles, green turtles, hawksbill turtles, loggerhead turtles, and leatherback turtles.

Territorial disputes
The area between Malaysia, Thailand, Cambodia, and Vietnam is subject to several territorial disputes. Malaysia and Thailand have chosen to jointly develop the disputed areas, which include the islands of Ko Kra and Ko Losin. A long-standing dispute between Cambodia and Vietnam in the Gulf of Thailand concerns mainly the island of Phú Quốc or Koh Tral in Khmer, which is off the Cambodian coast. Cambodia also claims  of shelf area.

See also
 2010 floods in Thailand and north Malaysia
 Apsara field

References

External links

 Maritime boundary delimitation in the gulf of Thailand – Schofield, Clive Howard (1999)

 
Thailand
Maritime Southeast Asia
Bodies of water of Cambodia
Bodies of water of Malaysia
Seas of Thailand
Gulfs of Vietnam
Bodies of water of the South China Sea
Cambodia–Thailand border
Cambodia–Vietnam border
Malaysia–Vietnam border
Gulfs of Asia